Larry Reeb (aka Uncle Lar) is a stand-up comedian from Chicago, Illinois. He is best known for his one-liners often followed by the catchphrase "That's a tip from your Uncle Lar". His earliest recorded and released performance was in 1987.

Reeb is a frequent guest on The Bob & Tom Show, as well as Todd-N-Tyler Radio Empire. In 2006, he auditioned for the fourth season of Last Comic Standing and made it to the second part of the quarterfinals.

Television/Video Appearances
"Opening Night at Rodney's Place" (Hosted by Rodney Dangerfield) - HBO
"Comedy Club Network" "Comedy Club Allstars 1" - Showtime
"Comic Strip Live" - Fox
"Comedy Express" - Fox
"Comedy on the Road" - A&E
"Standup Spotlight" - VH1
"1/2 Comedy Hour" - MTV
"Ben Around Town" - PBS
"Chicago Sports Profiles" (Hosted by Tom Dreesen) - Fox Sports Networks
"New Years Eve at Zanies" (Hosted by Jenny Jones) - WGN
"Truly Tasteless Jokes" - Vestron Video

Awards 
 Las Vegas Comedy Fest - Voted "Best of Fest" and "Comedy Club Pick"
 Chicago Music Awards - Voted "Chicago Comedian of the Year"

Discography
 It's A Sick World, I'm A Happy Guy (1999)
 It's A Sick World, I'm A Happy Guy, Volume 2 (2000)
 It's A Sick World, I'm A Happy Guy, Volume 3 (2009)

References

External links
 Official Website
 

Living people
People from Chicago
Comedians from Illinois
Year of birth missing (living people)